Mačvanski Prnjavor is a village in the municipality of Šabac, Serbia. According to the 2011 census, the village has a population of 3906 people.

References

Populated places in Mačva District